Woodmansey is a village and civil parish in the East Riding of Yorkshire, England.

Geography

The civil parish of Woodmansey consists of the villages of Woodmansey and Dunswell and the hamlet of Thearne. According to the 2011 United Kingdom census, Woodmansey parish had a population of 7,109, an increase on the 2001 UK census figure of 6,497.

The village has a small primary school, Woodmansey Church of England Voluntary Controlled Primary School, which was opened in 1856 and celebrated its 150th anniversary in 2006.

Opposite the school is the village church of St Peter's which was built to a design by Alfred Beaumont and opened in 1898.

The Warton Arms (pictured) with its thatched roof, is the only pub in the village.

Governance
The civil parish was in the Beverley and Holderness parliamentary constituency until the 2010 general election when it was transferred to the constituency of Haltemprice and Howden.

References

Villages in the East Riding of Yorkshire
Civil parishes in the East Riding of Yorkshire